Carl Legault (January 2, 1923 – March 12, 1983) was a Canadian politician. He represented the riding of Nipissing in the House of Commons of Canada from 1964 to 1972. He represented the Liberal Party.

Before entering politics, Legault was a furniture retailer in Sturgeon Falls.

He was first elected in a 1964 byelection, following the death of the district's longtime MP Jack Garland. He was reelected in the 1965 and 1968 elections, and then retired from politics in 1972. He died in 1983 and was buried at Sturgeon Falls.

References

External links
 

1923 births
1983 deaths
Liberal Party of Canada MPs
Members of the House of Commons of Canada from Ontario
Franco-Ontarian people
People from West Nipissing